Roanoke High School was the first public high school in Roanoke, Virginia.  Located at 211-217 Church Ave. S.W., it opened on February 6, 1899.  It closed in 1924, replaced by Jefferson High School, and became a school administration building.  It was demolished in February 1968 and is now the site of the Noel C. Taylor Municipal Building.

References 

Schools in Roanoke, Virginia
1924 disestablishments in Virginia
1899 establishments in Virginia